Mansonella is a genus of parasitic nematodes. It includes three species that are responsible for the disease mansonelliasis: Mansonella ozzardi, M. perstans, and M. streptocerca.

Species
There are nine species:
 Mansonella barbascalensis
 Mansonella llewellyni Price, 1962
 Mansonella longicapitata Eberhard, Campo-Aasen & Orihel, 1984
 Mansonella ozzardi Manson, 1897 – parasite of humans in Central and South America
 Mansonella perstans Manson, 1891 – parasite of humans and primates in Africa and South America
 Mansonella rodhaini
 Mansonella rotundicapitata Eberhard, Campo-Aasen & Orihel, 1984
 Mansonella semiclarum Fain, 1974
 Mansonella streptocerca – parasite of humans in West and Central Africa

References

Spirurida
Secernentea genera
Parasitic nematodes of mammals